Paul Brandner is a fictional character of German soap opera Verbotene Liebe (Forbidden Love). The character was portrayed by actor Tobias Schönenberg from April 15, 2005 to April 27, 2007. Paul was written out, when Schönenberg decided not to re-sign with the show .

Character's background
Paul is a passionate beach volleyball player and had a sad childhood. His biological mother Anna died of AIDS, when he was only twelve years old. Susanne Brandner (Claudia Scarpatetti), the best friend of his mother, decides to take care of him. She adopts Paul together with her husband Alex Wiegand (Frank Behnke). Together with his adoptive sister Lisa (Lilli Hollunder), who was a friend of his before, they become a real family, living in Buenos Aires. But their perfect world falls apart, when Alex keeps sleeping with another woman. Susanne tries to rescue their family and wants to hold on to her marriage. But when her company goes bankrupt, Susanne decides to leave Alex. Against his will, Susanne wants to take the children back to Germany, where her father Arno (Konrad Krauss) lives and she sees the chance to start over. She hides Lisa and Paul at a friend's place, while she flies to Germany and prepares their arrival.

It doesn't take long and Susanne brings Lisa and Paul to Germany. While Lisa thinks they are only visiting Arno, Paul discovered the one-way tickets and knows that Susanne came to stay. When Lisa finds out the truth, she has a huge fight with Susanne. Paul tries to interfere and reassure Lisa. But she stays mad for a while. On their first night at Arno's house, they meet Susanne's cousins Robin (Nils Brunkhorst), Jana (Vanessa Jung) and Jana's half-sister Nico, who brings Constantin von Lahnstein (Milan Marcus) with her. Lisa immediately begins to fall for him. Paul and Constantin seem to have a good connection as well and the three arrange to meet each other the very next day. Paul and Constantin become the best friends and share the passion for beach volleyball. While the training, they meet two beautifulwants  girls, Jeannine and Ariane and begin to flirt with them. Constantin invites them to Castle Königsbrunn, where he and Paul try to hook up with them. But Paul doesn't get late that night. The next morning, Paul wants to impress the girls with one of the cars, that Constantin's father Johannes (Thomas Gumpert) owns. After a little jaunt they even drive the girls home, when Paul and Constantin get flashed for fast driving. It seems to get worse, when Constantin's brother Ansgar (Wolfram Grandezka) catches them on their return. But Ansgar promises to keep quiet about their little adventure and it almost seems forgotten, when Carla (Claudia Hiersche) gets the letter from the police about Paul and Constantin's fast driving. But thanks to Lisa, Johannes can't be mad at them for long. After a back and forth, Ariane and Paul sleep together, but it doesn't get any further.

When Susanne breaks up with her short-time-boyfriend Jens, Paul thinks another man is behind the break-up. But he later discovers that Susanne seems to fall in love with Carla, Constantin's half-sister. At first, Susanne denies to have any feelings for Carla at all. But then she tells Paul her secret and Paul promises to keep quiet about it. Susanne is happy that she can tell Paul things like this and is impressed in how he is dealing with it. When Paul needs money for a surf trip he discovers an advertisement for a male nude model. He takes the job and is surprised, when Carla is one of the artists to sketch him. Because Paul doesn't want Susanne to find out about his job, he wants to quit. But Carla tells him that Susanne doesn't have to know and that they could keep it as their secret. Paul is impressed over Carla's coolness and starts to fall for her. End of 2006, Alex comes back to Germany for searching his family. He finds Susanne and tells her, he only wants Lisa to come back with him. Lisa can not make a decision. On the wedding of Susanne and Carla, Alex appears and brought with the post a bomb, which should explode the whole Castle Königsbrunn. He takes almost all of the guest as hostages. He wants to flee with Lisa, but Susanne cannot let that happened. So he want to shoot Carla and Susanne. Arno put himself in front and was shot by Alex. Leonard and Nico could save Arnos live. he had to move to a hospital for some time after. Alex was arrested and they brought him to a psychiatric, cause he was going mad. Lisa decides to stay with Paul, Arno and Susanne.

In April 2007, Paul leaves Düsseldorf and decides to start a new life with his former teacher Anne Siebert (Tabea Heynig) in Marseille. Susanne first refuses to let Paul go. But she then sees that Anne and Paul really seem to love each other and doesn't want to hold Paul back. One year later, Susanne and Lisa join Anne and Paul when they move to Marseille as well, after Susanne and Carla ended their marriage.

References

Verbotene Liebe characters
Television characters introduced in 2005